Narborough and Pentney station was in Norfolk, serving the villages of Narborough and Pentney.

History
It was on the line between King's Lynn and Swaffham opening with the line on 27 October 1846 and temporarily the terminus of the branch from Lynn. Nine months after Narborough station opened, its owner, the Lynn & Dereham Railway, was taken over by the East Anglian Railway (EAR). The line to Swaffham was opened 19 days after the EAR took over, on 10 August 1847.  It was closed in 1968.

References

Disused railway stations in Norfolk
Former Great Eastern Railway stations
Railway stations in Great Britain opened in 1846
Railway stations in Great Britain closed in 1968
1846 establishments in England
1968 disestablishments in England